Lubnice or Łubnice may refer to:
 Lubnice (Znojmo District), Czech Republic
 Lubnice, Berane Municipality, Montenegro
 Łubnice, Łódź Voivodeship, Poland
 Łubnice, Świętokrzyskie Voivodeship, Poland